The North American F-86 Sabre was a post-war jet fighter that entered service with the United States Air Force in 1949 and was retired from active duty by Bolivia in 1994. F-86s were licence-built in Italy by Fiat Aviazione and in Japan by Mitsubishi Heavy Industries; while variants were produced in Australia as the CAC CA-27 Sabre and in Canada as the Canadair CL-13 Sabre.

Argentina

F-86F
C-122  - National Aeronautics Museum, Morón, Buenos Aires.

Australia
Airworthy
CA-27 Mk.32
VH-IPN (A94-983) Royal Australian Air Force (RAAF) - restored to flying condition as VH-PCM in the 1980s and grounded in the 1990s; loaned to the Temora Aviation Museum, Temora, New South Wales, where it was again restored to airworthy condition; displayed regularly (registered VH-IPN) since September 2009. Ownership was transferred to the RAAF in July 2019 and it is operated by the Air Force Heritage Squadron (Temora Historic Flight).
VH-SBR (A94-352) - Latrobe Flying Museum Restored and owned by former squadron leader Jeff Trappett, using parts from A94-907 which he also owns. A94-352 had its second test flight 5 October 2013

On display
CA-26
A94-101 - RAAF Museum, RAAF Base Williams, Point Cook, Victoria; CAC Sabre prototype, first aircraft to fly faster than the speed of sound in Australia.

CA-27 Mk.31
A94-901 - Historical Aircraft Restoration Society, Illawarra Regional Airport, New South Wales; first production CAC Sabre.
A94-915 - Narromine Aviation Museum, Narromine Airport, New South Wales.
A94-935 - Queensland Air Museum, Caloundra, Queensland.

CA-27 Mk.32
A94-944 - RAAF Museum, RAAF Base Williams, Point Cook, Victoria.
A94-951 - Fighter World, RAAF Base Williamtown.
A94-959 - Fighter World, RAAF Base Williamtown.
A94-974 - Classic Jets Fighter Museum, Parafield Airport, South Australia.
A94-982 - RAAF Museum, RAAF Base Wagga, Forest Hill, New South Wales.
A94-989 - Australian National Aviation Museum, Moorabbin Airport, Victoria.

Stored or under restoration
CA-27 Mk.32
A94-970 - Australian War Memorial in storage at RAAF Williams, Point Cook, Victoria.

Belgium
F-86F 
5316 Portuguese Air Force F86F at the Royal Museum of the Armed Forces and Military History in Brussels

Brazil
F-86K
0014 - Museu Aeroespacial in Rio de Janeiro, Brazil.  This aircraft was donated by the Venezuelan Air Force.

Canada

On display
CL-13 Sabre Mk. I
 19101 Alberta Aviation Museum in Edmonton, Alberta.

CL-13 Sabre Mk III
19200 - Reynolds Alberta Museum, Wetaskiwin, Alberta.

CL-13 Sabre Mk. V

 23338 - Air Force Museum of Alberta, located within the Military Museums, Calgary, Alberta.
 23355 - Atlantic Canada Aviation Museum, Enfield, Nova Scotia.
 23257 - RCAF Memorial Museum, Trenton, Ontario.
 Community Gardens, Trenton, Ont, Golden Hawks colours, on pole, Trenton, Ontario.
 23221 - Royal Military College of Canada, Kingston, Ontario, on pole, Kingston, Ontario.
 23047 - Oshawa Airport (gate guard on pole back entrance), Oshawa, Ontario.
 23164 - Germain Park, Sarnia, Ont, Golden Hawks colours, on pole, Sarnia, Ontario, has been dismounted and repainted. Back on display in and seen in Sept. 2015..
 23649 - Blockhouse Island, Brockville, Ont, Golden Hawks colours, on pole, Brockville, Ontario.
 23245 - Peterborough Riverview Park & Zoo, on pole, refurbished 2009, Peterborough, Ontario
 23053 - Belleville Centennial Park, Ont, Golden Hawks colours, on pole, Belleville, Ontario.

CL-13 Sabre Mk VI
1815 (Pakistan Air Force) - Western Canada Aviation Museum in Winnipeg, Manitoba. Was the final CL-13 airframe built by Canadair.
23060 - Army, Navy and Air force Veterans Club #302  -  9831 - 4th Street, Sidney, B.C. Based on serial should be listed as a MK V if serial correct.
23651 Golden Hawks - Canadian Warplane Heritage Museum, John C. Munro International Airport, Hamilton, Ontario

Colombia
On display
CL-13B Sabre Mk. VI
El Dorado Airport.
Cali Air Base.
F-86K
ex Venezuelan Air Force at the Palanquero Air Base

Czech Republic
(serial number unknown) - at the Aviation Museum - Kbely, Prague.

France
Airworthy
CL-13 Sabre Mk VI
F-AYSB - privately owned at Avignon-Caumont.

Germany

CL-13 Sabre Mk VI
D-9542 - Luftwaffenmuseum der Bundeswehr, Berlin-Gatow.
JA+111 - Luftwaffenmuseum der Bundeswehr, Berlin-Gatow.
JB+110 - Uetersen Airfield.
KE+105 - Deutsches Museum Flugwerft Schleissheim
F-86K
JD-249 - Luftwaffenmuseum der Bundeswehr, Berlin-Gatow.

Greece
F-86D
51-8404 - Athens War Museum.

Honduras
F-86K
. FAH 1101 on display at Armando Escalon AB, La Lima

Indonesia

CA-27 Mk.32
 TS-8603 - Halim Perdanakusuma International Airport, East Jakarta, Jakarta
 TS-8607 - Umbul Madiun Recreational Park, Madiun Regency, East Java
 TS-8608 - Sultan Mahmud Badaruddin II International Airport, Palembang, South Sumatra. Fitted with the tail of TS-8614
 TS-8609 - Wana Wisata Dander, Bojonegoro Regency, East Java
 TS-8615 - Indonesian Air Force Academy, Sleman Regency, Special Region of Yogyakarta
 TS-8616 - Sendang Asri Park, Gajah Mungkur Dam, Wonogiri Regency, Central Java
 TS-8618 - Dirgantara Mandala Museum, Sleman Regency, Special Region of Yogyakarta
 TS-8621 - Iswahyudi Air Force Base, Magetan, East Java
 TS-8622 - Gedung Juang 45 Pekanbaru, Pekanbaru, Riau

Italy
CL-13
 CL-13 Mk.4 MM19724 Italian Air Force Museum, Vigna di Valle, formerly Royal Canadian Air Force XD723  
F-86K
 MM55-4868 Italian Air Force Museum, Vigna di Valle, formerly flown by Armee de L'air

Japan
F-86D
 Ashiya Air Field, Ashiya, Fukuoka Prefecture
 Komaki Airbase, Komaki, Aichi Prefecture
 Tsuiki Airbase, Chikujo, Fukuoka Prefecture
 Gifu Air Field, Gifu, Gifu Prefecture
 Chippubetsu Family Sports Park, Chippubetsu, Hokkaido Prefecture
 Chitose Air Base, Chitose, Hokkaido Prefecture
 Matsushima Air Base, Matsushima, Miyagi Prefecture
 Nyutabaru Air Base, Shintomi, Miyazaki Prefecture
 Hyakuri Air Base, Omitama, Ibaraki Prefecture
 Komatsu Air Base, Komatsu, Ishikawa Prefecture
 Kaimondake Nature Park, Ibusuki, Kagoshima Prefecture
 Hijiri Aviation Museum, Omi, Nagano Prefecture
 Nara Air Base, Nara, Nara Prefecture
 Kumagaya Air Base, Kumagaya, Saitama Prefecture
 Camp Ōtsu GSDF base, Ōtsu, Shiga Prefecture
 Forward fuselage, Fujisan Juku no Mori Park, Gotemba Shizuoka Prefecture
 Hamamatsu Air Base, Hamamatsu, Shizuoka Prefecture
 Shizuhama Air Base, Yaizu, Shizuoka Prefecture
 Miho Air Base, Tottori Prefecture
 Hōfu Kita Air Base, Yamaguchi Prefecture
 Japan Aviation High School, Kai, Yamanashi Prefecture

F-86F

 02-7970 Kawaguchiko Motor Museum
 02-7960 Kawaguchiko Motor Museum
 Komaki Airbase, Komaki, Aichi Prefecture
 Mitsubishi Heavy Industries Komaki South Plant Komaki, Aichi Prefecture
 Nukata District Museum Kōta, Aichi Prefecture
 Ashiya Air Field, Ashiya, Fukuoka Prefecture
 Kasuga Air Base, Kasuga, Fukuoka Prefecture
 Tsuiki Airbase, Tsuiki, Fukuoka Prefecture
 Old Car Centre, Naraha, Fukushima Prefecture
 Gifu Air Field, Gifu, Gifu Prefecture
 Chitose Air Base, Chitose, Hokkaido Prefecture
 Hyakuri Air Base, Omitama, Ibaraki Prefecture
 Komatsu Air Base, Komatsu, Ishikawa Prefecture
 Matsushima Air Base, Matsushima, Miyagi Prefecture
 Nyutabaru Air Base, Shintomi, Miyazaki Prefecture
 Hijiri Aviation Museum, Omi, Nagano Prefecture
 Nara Air Base, Nara, Nara Prefecture
 Drug Tops Drugstore Uonuma, Niigata Prefecture
 Nippon Bunri University, Ōita, Ōita Prefecture
 Hachimenzan Nature Park, Sankō, Ōita Prefecture
 82-7807 Iruma Air Base, Sayama, Saitama Prefecture
 Kumagaya Air Base, Kumagaya, Saitama Prefecture
 Hamamatsu Air Base, Hamamatsu, Shizuoka Prefecture
 A second F-86F also at Hamamatsu Air Base, Hamamatsu, Shizuoka Prefecture
 Sodeura Park, Iwata, Shizuoka Prefecture
 Shizuhama Air Base, Yaizu, Shizuoka Prefecture
 Utsunomiya Air Field, Utsunomiya, Tochigi Prefecture
 62-7511 (displayed as FU-832 Nina II), Yokota Air Base, Fussa, Tokyo Prefecture

Malaysia 

 FM19-17 on display outside at Perak Museum, Taiping, Perak

Netherlands
CL13B
c/n 1704 North American (Canadair) CL-13B Sabre Mk.6 on display as FU-012 / 25012 at Vliegveld Teuge

F-86F
52-5385 - FU-385 on display outside at the Nationaal Militair Museum, Soesterberg
F-86K
53-8305 - (ex Italian Air Force) on display as Q-305 / 54-1305. Nationaal Militair Museum, Soesterberg
54-1283 - Q-283 on display outside at the Nationaal Militair Museum, Soesterberg

New Zealand
CA-27 Mk.31
A94-922 - under restoration to fly at Ardmore Airport, Auckland, for a private collector in the USA.

Norway
F-86F
52-5069 - AH-D, Forsvarets flysamling Gardermoen, Oslo Airport, Gardermoen near Oslo.
52-5202 - MU-F, Gateguard at Ørland Main Air Station
53-1082 - AH-A, Flyhistorisk Museum, Sola, Stavanger Airport, Sola, near Stavanger.
53-1206 - FN-D, Norwegian Aviation Museum, in Bodø.

F-86K
54-1245 - RI-Z, Stored at Norwegian Aviation Museum, in Bodø.
54-1266 - ZK-L, Flyhistorisk Museum, Sola, Stavanger Airport, Sola, near Stavanger.
54-1274 - RI-T, Forsvarets flysamling Gardermoen, Oslo Airport, Gardermoen near Oslo.
54-1290 - ZK-Z, Dakota Norway, Sandefjord Airport, Torp near Sandefjord.

Pakistan 

 North American F-86 Sabre

31-125, on display at PAF Base Nur Khan
52-5031, on display at Murree.
53-216, on display at Multan
53-1102, on display at Swat chowk, Haripur district
55-4998, on display at Faisalabad.
 Canadair Sabre

1705, On display at Faisalabad.
1709, on display at Fizagat Recreation Park in Mingora.
1792, on display at PAF Museum
1797, on display at Karachi

Philippines
F-86D
524140, on display at the Philippine Air Force Aerospace Museum, Manila.

F-86F
24468, on display at the Philippine Air Force Aerospace Museum, Manila.

Saudi Arabia
F-86F
 Royal Saudi Air Force Museum, Riyadh.

Serbia
F-86D
14102 Museum of Aviation, Belgrade.

F-86E
11025 Museum of Aviation, Belgrade.

11054 Museum of Aviation, Belgrade.

11088 Museum of Aviation, Belgrade.

Slovenia
On Display
F-86D modified in IF-86
14325 Pivka Park of Military History

South Africa
Airworthy
CL-13B Mk6
367 "E" - stored at South African Air Force Museum, AFB Swartkop, Pretoria.

On display
CL-13B Mk6
361 "F" - South African Air Force Museum, AFB Swartkop, Pretoria.

South Korea
 On Display
 F-86D

51-2910 - USAF 51st Fighter Wing area, Osan Air Base, South Korea
51-8502 - War Memorial of Korea

Spain
On display

F-86F C.5-82 at Torrejón, Spain.
F-86F C.5-58 at Museo del Aire de Cuatro Vientos, Spain.
F-86F C.5-175 at Museo del Aire de Cuatro Vientos, Spain.
F-86F C.5-231 at Morón, Spain.
F-86F C.5-101 at Valencia, Spain

Thailand
F-86F
At Korat RTAFB, Nakhon Ratchasima.
1926 at Lopburi - Army Aviation Center (VTBH), Thailand.
At Lopburi - Army Aviation Center (VTBH), Thailand.
4313 at the Bangkok - National Science Centre for Education, Thailand
1314 at Bangkok Don Muang International Airport (DMK / VTBD), Thailand.
4342 at Takhli RTAFB (TKH / VTPI), Thailand.
1211 at Bangkok - National Science Centre for Education, Thailand.
1315 at the RTAF Academy, Thailand.
1362 at Khok Kathiam (KKM / VTBL), Thailand.
1325 at Bangkok Don Muang International Airport (DMK / VTBD), Thailand.
1425 at Bangkok Don Muang International Airport (DMK / VTBD), Thailand.
4345 at Chiang Mai - International (CNX / VTCC), Thailand.
4334 at Bangkok Don Muang International Airport (DMK / VTBD), Thailand.
5032 at Chiang Mai - International (CNX / VTCC), Thailand.
4322 at the RTAF Museum RTAF Base Don Mueang
F-86L
1213 at  Nakhon Nayok
1215 at Don Mueang
1232 at the RTAF Academy, Bangkok, Thailand.
1214 at Thanon Phahon, Yothin Town, Thailand.

Turkey

F-86F 19268 at Istanbul Aviation Museum.
F-86E 19207/207 at Istanbul Aviation Museum.

United Kingdom

On Display

F-86A
48-0242 - Midland Air Museum, England.

CL-13 Sabre Mk. IV
XB812 - Royal Air Force Museum Cosford.

F-86D
51-6171 - North East Aircraft Museum, Sunderland.  It is the only 'D' model left in the UK.

United States

Airworthy
F-86A
N48178 (48-0178) - privately owned in Grove, Oklahoma.
N4912 (49-1217) - based at the Flying Heritage Collection in Everett, Washington.
F-86F
N51RS (51-13417) - based at the Mid-Atlantic Air Museum in Reading, Pennsylvania.
N860AG (52-4666) - privately owned in Houston, Texas.
N86NA (52-4731) - privately owned in Grand Prairie, Texas.
N86FR (52-4959) (painted as 53-1201) - privately owned in Palmetto Bay, Florida.
N188RL (52-4986) - based at the Warbird Heritage Foundation in Waukegan, Illinois.
N186AM (52-5012) - based at the Planes of Fame Museum in Chino, California.
N286CF (52-5116) - privately owned in Wellington, Florida.
N86F (52-5139) - privately owned in Indianapolis, Indiana.

Canadair CL-13 Mk.5
N87FS (RCAF23285) - privately owned in Belgrade, Montana.
N4869H (RCAF23293) - based at the Cavanaugh Flight Museum in Addison, Texas.
N386BB (RCAF23314) - privately owned in Melbourne Beach, Florida.
N8686F (RCAF23363) - based at the Museum of Flight in Seattle, Washington.

Canadair CL-13 Mk.6
N1FT (RCAF23671) - privately owned in Houston, Texas.  It is painted as Hell-Er Bust X with the s/n of 51-2756.
N3842H (RCAF23682) - based at the Yanks Air Museum in Chino, California.
N106JB (RCAF23684) - based at the War Eagles Air Museum in Santa Teresa, New Mexico.
N38453 (RCAF23697) - privately owned in Mojave, California.
N50CJ (RCAF23700) - privately owned in Waukesha, Wisconsin.
N186PJ - based at Lewis Air Legends in San Antonio, Texas.

On display
F-86A
47-0605 - Lackland AFB, San Antonio, Texas.
47-0615 - Fort Wayne Air National Guard Station, Fort Wayne, Indiana.  Formerly at Octave Chanute Aerospace Museum (former Chanute AFB), Illinois; On loan from the United States Air Force Museum.
47-0637 - 120th Airlift Wing complex, Great Falls ANGB, Great Falls, Montana.
48-0260 - National Air and Space Museum, Washington, DC.
48-0281 - Fairchild AFB, Spokane, Washington.
49-1046 - Naval Base Ventura County, at the entrance to the Channel Islands Air National Guard Station in Point Mugu, California
49-1067 (displayed as 49-1236) - National Museum of the United States Air Force, Wright-Patterson AFB, Dayton, Ohio.
49-1095 - Selfridge Military Air Museum, Selfridge ANGB, Mount Clemens, Michigan.
49-1195 - Elmendorf AFB (North Side), Anchorage, Alaska.
49-1272 - 144th Fighter Wing complex, Fresno Air National Guard Base, Fresno, California.
49-1301 (displayed as 51-2760) - Maxwell Air Force Base Air Park, Alabama.

F-86D
50-0477 (display as 52-3863 Dennis the Menace) - National Museum of the United States Air Force, Wright-Patterson AFB, Dayton, Ohio.
51-5915 - San Carlos Intermediate School, San Carlos, Arizona.  Faded markings indicate previous assignment to then-125th Fighter-Interceptor Group of the Florida Air National Guard.
51-5938 - Army Legion Home, Appleton, Wisconsin.
51-6069 - Berryman War Memorial Park, Bridgeport, Washington.
51-6261 (painted as 52-10115) - Chandler City Park, Chandler, Arizona.
51-8409 - Oklahoma ANGB - 138th FG, Tulsa, Oklahoma.
51-8455 - Twinning Park, Monroe, Wisconsin.
52-3653 - Pueblo Weisbrod Aircraft Museum, Pueblo, Colorado.
52-3669 - McChord Air Museum, McChord Air Force Base, Washington.
52-3679 - 134th Air Refueling Wing complex, McGhee Tyson Air National Guard Base, Maryville, Tennessee.
52-3735 - Crete Municipal Airport, Crete, Nebraska.
52-3754 (painted as 52-4043) - 45th Infantry Division Museum, Oklahoma City, Oklahoma.
52-3770 - Texas Military Forces Museum, Austin ANG Headquarters, Austin, Texas.
52-3784 - Palm View Park, West Covina, California
52-4243 - Southern Museum of Flight, Birmingham, Alabama.
53-0781 - Wadleigh Park, Vale, Oregon.
53-1061 - Veterans of Foreign Wars (VFW) Post 2567, Jackson, Mississippi.

F-86E

49-1273 (false markings, composite of several E and F models, data plate was lost) - Salt Lake City, Utah.
50-0593 - Veterans of Foreign Wars (VFW) Post 1798, Tulia, TX.
50-0600 - Pima Air & Space Museum, adjacent to Davis-Monthan AFB, Tucson, Arizona.
50-0632 - Veterans of Foreign Wars (VFW) Post 7119, Fort Harrison, Indianapolis, Indiana.
50-0653 - Hickam AFB, Honolulu, Hawaii.
51-2841 - Pacific Aviation Museum Pearl Harbor, Pearl Harbor, Hawaii.
51-13010 - Nellis Air Force Base, Las Vegas, Nevada.
51-13028 - Holloman AFB, Alamogordo, New Mexico.
51-13067 - Planes of Fame, Chino, California.
52-2844 - Illinois Air National Guard Base, Springfield, Illinois.

F-86F

51-2769 (false markings, composite of many airframes) - Warhawk Air Museum, Nampa, Idaho.
51-2826 - (False markings - F-86A of the Idaho Air National Guard) Idaho Military Museum, Boise, Idaho.
51-13082 - Aerospace Museum of California, Sacramento, California.
51-13278 - Arizona ANGB, Tucson, Arizona.
51-13371 - New England Air Museum, Windsor Locks, Connecticut.
52-4978 - Hill Aerospace Museum, Hill AFB, Utah.
52-5143 - Air Zoo, Kalamazoo, Michigan.
52-5241 - Edwards AFB, Palmdale, California.
52-5323 - Luke AFB, Arizona.
52-5434 - Clay County Courthouse in Brazil, Indiana.
52-5513 (displayed as 51-2831) - Air Force Armament Museum, Eglin AFB, Florida.
52-9371 (false markings, real s/n unknown) - NAS Fallon, Fallon, Nevada.
55-3818 - Goldwater Air National Guard Base, Phoenix Airport, Phoenix, Arizona.
55-3937 - Western Museum of Flight, Los Angeles, California.
55-5014 - San Diego Air and Space Museum, Gillespie Field Annex, San Diego, California.
55-5035 - (displayed as 51-2734) Chico Air Museum, Restored for static display by Chico Air Museum Volunteers 2016. Displayed as "Mama Inez" flown in the Korean conflict by Lee Koenig Chico, California.
57-6416 - Westover Field Amador County Airport, Sutter Creek, California.
RF-86F
51-13390 - Air Classics Museum, Aurora, Illinois.
52-4492 - National Museum of the United States Air Force, Wright-Patterson AFB, Ohio.
52-4758 - Estrella Warbird Museum, Paso Robles, California.
52-4913 - Pacific Coast Air Museum, Santa Rosa, California.

F-86H

52-1976 - Cleveland Park, Greenville, South Carolina.
52-1983 (displayed as 52-4812)- Vermillion County Airport, Danville, Illinois.
52-1993 - EAA AirVenture Museum, Oshkosh, Wisconsin.
52-2044 - Front Royal Warren County Airport, Front Royal, Virginia.
52-2048 - Veterans of Foreign Wars (VFW) Post 7472, Ellicott City, Maryland.
52-2054 - Lockheed Plant 42, Palmdale, California.
52-2058 - Preserved by West Virginia Air National Guard, Eastern West Virginia Regional Airport, Martinsburg, West Virginia, ANG Base on field. 
52-2090 - Museum of Flying, Los Angeles, California.
52-5737 - Veterans Memorial Park, Burlington Township, New Jersey.
52-5747 (displayed as 53-1483) - Tactical Air Command Memorial Park, Langley AFB, Virginia.
53-1230 - Castle Air Museum, former Castle AFB, Atwater, California.
53-1239 - Barnes Air National Guard Base, Westfield, Massachusetts.  It was on display at the Pate Museum of Transportation in Cresson, Texas before that museum shutdown.
53-1250 - Lakeville Veterans Memorial, Lakeville, Minnesota.
53-1251 - Cannon AFB Memorial Park, Cannon AFB, New Mexico.
53-1253 - Jamestown Regional Airport, North Dakota.
53-1255 - War Memorial Auditorium, Holiday Park (west side), Fort Lauderdale, Florida.
53-1296 - Greater Wilmington Airport/New Castle Air National Guard Base, Delaware.
53-1298 - Churubusco Park, Churubusco, Indiana.
53-1300 - Combat Air Museum at Topeka Regional Airport (Forbes Field) in Topeka, Kansas.
53-1302 - South Dakota Air and Space Museum, Ellsworth AFB, South Dakota.
53-1304 - March Field Air Museum, March ARB (former March AFB), Riverside, California.
53-1306 (displayed as 53-0915) - American Legion Post 915, Syracuse, New York.
53-1308 - Wings Over the Rockies Air and Space Museum, former Lowry AFB, Denver, Colorado.
53-1328 - Pacific Coast Air Museum, Santa Rosa, California.
53-1337 - American Legion Post 34, Shortsville, New York.
53-1338 - Beaver County Airport, Pennsylvania.
53-1339 - 175th Wing complex, Warfield Air National Guard Base, Baltimore, Maryland.
53-1344 - President Lincoln and Soldiers' Home National Monument, Washington D.C.
53-1351 - Planes of Fame, Chino, California.
53-1352 - National Museum of the United States Air Force, Wright-Patterson AFB, Dayton, Ohio.
53-1353 - Hanscom AFB, Bedford, Massachusetts.
53-1358 - Wisconsin National Guard Memorial Library and Museum, Volk Field, Camp Douglas, Wisconsin.
53-1359 - Legion Community Park, Argyle, Wisconsin.
53-1361 - Middlesboro - Kentucky Airport, Middlesboro, Kentucky.
53-1370 - Goldsboro, North Carolina.
53-1372 - Hettinger, North Dakota.
53-1375 - Strategic Air & Space Museum in Ashland, Nebraska.
53-1386 - Memorial Park, McEntire Air National Guard Base, South Carolina.
53-1392 - Walhalla Municipal Airport, Walhalla, North Dakota.
53-1501 - Mid-America Air Museum, Liberal, Kansas.
53-1503 - McCook Army Air Base, McCook, Nebraska.
53-1511 - Museum of Aviation, Robins AFB, Georgia.
53-1515 - Apple Valley Airport, Victorville, California.
53-1525 - Pima Air & Space Museum, adjacent to Davis-Monthan AFB, Tucson, Arizona.

F-86L
50-0560 - March Field Air Museum, March ARB (former March AFB), Riverside, California.
51-2968 - Aerospace Museum of California, Sacramento, California.
51-2993 - Battleship Memorial Park, Mobile, Alabama.
51-3064 - Air Power Park, Hampton, Virginia.
51-5891 - Georgia ANGB - 165th AG, Savannah, Georgia.
51-6055 - Hill Aerospace Museum, Hill AFB, Utah.
51-6071 - Davis Monthan AFB Warrior Park, Tucson, Arizona.
51-6078 - City of Milton, Milton, West Virginia.
51-6144 - Perrin Air Force Base Museum, Denison, Texas.
52-3651 - Museum of Aviation, Warner Robins AFB, Macon, Georgia.
52-4142 - Air National Guard, Charlotte-Douglas International Airport, Charlotte, North Carolina.
52-4168 - 122nd Bomb Squadron - Jackson Barracks Military Museum, New Orleans, Louisiana.
52-4191 - Pacific Aviation Museum Pearl Harbor, Pearl Harbor, Hawaii.
52-4239 - Inde Motorsport Ranch, Willcox, Arizona.
52-4256 - Reflections of Freedom Air Park, McConnell AFB, Wichita, Kansas.
52-10052 - Crane Park in Monroe, New York.
52-10057 - Valdosta, Georgia.
52-10133 (displayed as 51-0133) - Flag Park, Tyndall AFB, Florida.
53-0566 - American Legion Post 353, Wild Horse Park, Mustang, Oklahoma.
53-0568 - Veterans Memorial Park, Winnemucca, Nevada.
53-0635 - Air Victory Museum, Lumberton, New Jersey.
53-0642 - California ANGB - 144th Fighter Wing, Fresno, California.
53-0658 - Military Aircraft Preservation Society (MAPS) Air Museum, Green, Ohio.
53-0665 - Veterans of Foreign Wars (VFW) Post 7714, Imperial, Pennsylvania.
53-0668 - Berry Field ANGB, Nashville, Tennessee.
53-0700 - Ehlert Park, Brookfield, Illinois.
53-0704 - Travis AFB Heritage Center, California.
53-0719 - Wells Municipal Airport, Wells, Minnesota.
53-0750 - Iowa City Municipal Airport, Iowa.
53-0782 - Peterson Air and Space Museum, Peterson AFB, Colorado Springs, Colorado.
53-0831 - Nebraska ANGB - 155th ARG, Lincoln, Nebraska.

53-0847 - County War Memorial, Greenup, Kentucky.
53-0894 - Pennsylvania ANGB - 171st ARW, Pittsburgh, Pennsylvania.
53-0965 - Pima Air & Space Museum, adjacent to Davis-Monthan AFB in Tucson, Arizona.
53-0997 - Bert Mooney Airport, Butte, Montana.
53-1022 - Fanning Field / Idaho Falls Regional Airport, Idaho Falls, Idaho.
53-1030 - NAS Fort Worth JRB (former Carswell AFB), Fort Worth, Texas
53-1045 - Historic Wendover Airfield, Wendover, Utah.
53-1060 - Yankee Air Museum, Belleville, Michigan.
53-1064 - Memorial Park, McEntire Air National Guard Base, South Carolina.
53-4035 - Linear Air Park / Texas Museum of Military History, Dyess AFB, Abilene, Texas.

Canadair CL-13 Mk.5
RCAF23147 - Pima Air & Space Museum, adjacent to Davis-Monthan AFB in Tucson, Arizona.
RCAF23226 - Former England AFB, Louisiana .
RCAF23231 - Joe Davies Heritage Airpark at Palmdale Plant 42, Palmdale, California .

Canadair CL-13 Mk.6
RCAF23226 - Former England AFB, Louisiana .

Under restoration or in storage
F-86F
52-4689 - to airworthiness by the Vintage Flying Museum in Fort Worth, Texas.

Canadair CL-13 Mk.5
 RCAF23300 - in storage by private owner in Carson City, Nevada.
Canadair CL-13 Mk.6
 RCAF23678 - in storage by private owner in Encino, California.

Notes

References

External links

 Aero-web: List of Sabres On Display in United States

North American F-86 Sabre
Survivors